Antistia (fl. 86–82 BCE) was a Roman woman and the first of the five wives of Gnaeus Pompeius, later known as Pompey the Great.

Little is known of Antistia outside her marriage to Pompey. She was promised to Pompey in marriage by her father, the lawyer, orator and senator Publius Antistius, in 86 BCE, while Antistius was presiding over the trial of Pompey for financial misconduct. In 82 or 81 BCE, Pompey divorced her in favour of Aemilia, the stepdaughter of Sulla, at the dictator's urging. The affair attracted criticism in Rome, and was used by Pompey's later political enemies to portray him as placing political self-interest over his familial duties.

The lack of secure historical information on Antistia's life freed later dramatists and writers to fictionalise her feelings and motives in her marriage, and to invent more elaborate endings to the story. Beginning with the French dramatist Pierre Corneille, who included her in his 1662 play Sertorius, Antistia has been presented as a cruelly-treated victim of Pompey's political ambition, whose love for her husband proved little obstacle to his own self-interest and the machinations of Sulla.

Sources

The only surviving source for Antistia's life and relationship with Pompey is Plutarch's Lives. The most complete account is found in his Life of Pompey, though he also included details of the divorce in the Life of Sulla. Plutarch was born , approximately 130 years after the events he describes.

These accounts are known to be based on sources hostile to Pompey: in particular, the account of Antistia has been linked with Oppius, a Caesarian propagandist whose work Plutarch consulted while writing the Life of Pompey. The relevant sections of the Life of Pompey have been characterised as primarily concerned with making political points about Sulla's tyranny and presenting the affair through a tragic lens, with comparatively little regard for the facts of the story or its chronological accuracy. Keith Hopkins has suggested that the motives imputed by Plutarch to the various characters should be regarded as "suspect".

Family 

Antistia was a member of a relatively obscure plebeian family, the gens Antistia, which later gained patrician status in 29 BCE under Octavian. Her mother, Calpurnia, was likewise of plebeian ancestry, though her family (the gens Calpurnia) had attained the rank of nobiles by 180 BCE, when her ancestor  was consul.

Antistia's father, Publius Antistius, rose to prominence in the early 80s BCE, judged by Cicero as among the best of a poor crop of orators active at that time. Having dominated politics in the previous years, Sulla was absent from Rome for much of the First Mithridatic War (89–85 BCE), allowing his enemies, Gaius Marius and then Cornelius Cinna, to gain political supremacy. Cicero described this as a time of lawlessness and corruption, and Antistius's prominence has been taken as evidence for his implication in the judicial irregularities of the period. 

In 88 BCE, Antistius was elected tribune of the plebs. In this role, he gained prominence for his successful opposition to the candidacy of Gaius Julius Caesar Strabo for consul, on the grounds that Strabo had not previously held the necessary office of praetor. This brought Antistius greater public visibility and a reputation as a prosecutor; Cicero recalls that "every case of importance" was brought to him.

Marriage to Pompey 

The trial has been largely characterised as a sham, with its outcome assured from the start. Antistius showed favour to Pompey throughout the trial, and secretly promised Antistia to him in marriage while the proceedings were still ongoing. This fact, however, became common knowledge: when Antistius announced the verdict of acquittal, Plutarch reports that the crowd began shouting "", the customary acclamation of a marriage.

Antistia's marriage to Pompey has thus been interpreted as "the most characteristic example of political marriage, and … the most pitiful and pathetic": as a cynically-minded attempt by Antistius to increase his standing through alliance to an up-and-coming young nobleman, and by Pompey as an equally-cynical attempt to avoid any chance of an adverse verdict, as well as to gain the favour and patronage of Antistius and his family. Erich Gruen has described it as the first of Pompey's marriages intended to give him "access to the inner citadels of senatorial power", though the alliance ultimately proved of little political value to him.

Pompey was around twenty years old at the time of the marriage. Antistia's age is not recorded; it was normal for Roman women to make their first marriage before the age of twenty, though aristocratic girls often married much younger, typically between the ages of twelve and fifteen. No children are known from the marriage, which is generally assumed to have been childless.

Divorce 

In 82 or 81 BCE, Sulla and his wife Metella persuaded Pompey to divorce Antistia in favour of Sulla's stepdaughter, Aemilia. The reasons for the marriage are ambiguous, and perhaps mixed: Plutarch explains the marriage through Sulla's desire to reward Pompey for his successful service in the civil war against the Marians during 83–82, and to make a marriage alliance with a capable man who could be of use to him. However, the marriage has also been characterised as Sulla's attempt to neutralise the potential threat of Pompey's popularity and growing power. Pompey, for his own part, considered himself a 'Sullan' for the remainder of the dictator's life, and for at least a decade after Sulla's death in 78 BCE; maintaining his connection to Sulla was an important factor in his own marriage to Mucia Tertia in 79 BCE and that of his daughter Pompeia Magna to the dictator's son Faustus Cornelius Sulla.
 
The divorce was criticised in Roman society, and seems to have been painful for Pompey: Plutarch writes that it 'befitted the needs of Sulla rather than the nature and habits of Pompey', in that Aemilia was already pregnant by her current husband, the future consul Manius Acilius Glabrio, and was soon to die giving birth to his son. The remark may also allude to Pompey's passionate nature and, perhaps, his attachment to Antistia. For Antistia, the divorce was part of a period of great misfortune: her father had been killed in 82 BCE by Marian supporters, the so-called Cinnani, during a senate-meeting at the Curia Hostilia. The murder was instigated by the praetor Junius Damasippus, who viewed Antistius as unreliable, despite his earlier co-operation, due to his marriage alliance with Pompey. Her mother, Calpurnia, had also killed herself upon hearing of the divorce, which Plutarch described as an "indignity". The damage to Pompey's reputation caused by the divorce has been cited as a contributing factor towards his cultivation of an alliance with Marcus Aemilius Lepidus, the father of the future triumvir, in 79 BCE.

Little is known of Antistia's reaction to the divorce, or of her life afterwards. By Roman standards, the marriage was short: while approximately a third of known Roman marriages ended in divorce, they averaged around twenty-one years in duration, and most short marriages were ended by death. Both Plutarch and the modern scholar Thomas Hillman have described the marriage as a "Greek tragedy".

Antistia has been described as a "political victim", and the affair has taken as evidence of Roman women's lack of control over their marital lives, and the overarching importance of political concerns over personal in aristocratic Roman marriages. However, the parallels between Plutarch's account of Pompey's divorce from Antistia and his account of Caesar's refusal to divorce his own wife, Cornelia, when ordered to do so by Sulla have led to the suggestion that the framing of the narrative as found in Plutarch may originate in anti-Pompeian propaganda written by Caesar's supporters after the outbreak of civil war between the two in 49 BCE. Susan Jacobs has also situated Plutarch's narrative of Antistia's marriage and divorce in a tradition of 'advice literature' to statesmen, and viewed Plutarch's portrayal of the affair as a warning of how marriage alliances could serve both as political tools and as reputational risks.

Cultural depictions 

Antistia has been featured in several later works of fiction, which have often portrayed her as feeling genuine love for Pompey, and used her story to create a tension between Pompey's own love for her and his political interests.

Antistia is a character in the 1662 play Sertorius by Pierre Corneille. The play is primarily based on Plutarch's Life of Sertorius but draws on the Life of Pompey and the Life of Sulla for its material on Antistia. Corneille renames Antistia to 'Aristie', a name first given to her by the early medieval chronicler John of Biclaro, on the grounds that the latter name was "sweeter to the ear". Corneille also created a fictionalised account of Antistia's life after her divorce from Pompey, in which she took refuge in Spain. 'Aristie' is notable within the play as the only character motivated by love, despite the play's apparent focus on marriage and romantic relationships: her dialogue with Pompey in Act 3 has been described as the play's 'only approach to passion'. Pompey, similarly, is presented as having loved Aristie, but reluctantly divorced her in order to follow Sulla's commands, and so to maintain his favour and eventually succeed to his power. Aristie has been described as a 'feminine' counterpoint to the play's other major female character, the fictional warrior-queen Viriate, who rejects love and sees marriage as a purely strategic decision. The contemporary author and critic François Hédelin, abbé d'Aubignac, identified Aristie as the heroine of the play.

Antistia also appears in The Tragedy of Pompey the Great, a play by John Masefield first performed in 1910. As in Corneille's play, Antistia is portrayed as deeply loving Pompey; Masefield has her urge her husband to stay with her rather than departing for war. She represents the attractions of love and domestic life as opposed to Pompey's military duty, creating what Arthur E. DuBois characterises as a conflict between the "philosophy of beauty", represented by Antistia, and the "philosophy of work".

In the 1929 Latin-language play  (The General's Son), a fictionalised romance between Antistia and Pompey during the Social War becomes a minor plotline. Antistia, disobeying her father, goes for a walk unaccompanied around his villa, and ends up astray near the military camp of Gnaeus Pompeius Strabo, Pompey's father. There, she meets her future husband, who leads her home.

In Phyllis Bentley's 1936 novel Freedom, Farewell!, Pompey is depicted as loving Antistia and the suicide of her mother is the cause of Aemilia's death. Aemilia hears the news of Calpurnia's suicide during a wedding ceremony and is so upset for Antistia's pain that she suffers a seizure that results in a miscarriage and her own death.

Footnotes

Explanatory notes

References

Bibliography 

 
 
 
 
 
 
 
 
 
 
 
 
 
 
 
 
 
 
 
 
 
 
 
 
 
 
 
 
 
 
 
 
 
 

Wives of Pompey
Antistii
Year of birth unknown
1st-century BC Roman women